Matiaburj College is an undergraduate liberal arts college in Kolkata, India. It is affiliated with the University of Calcutta.

Departments

Arts

Bengali
English
History
Hindi
Urdu
Political Science
Education

See also 
List of colleges affiliated to the University of Calcutta
Education in India
Education in West Bengal

References

External links
http://www.matiaburjcollege.org/index.html

University of Calcutta affiliates
Educational institutions established in 2008
2008 establishments in West Bengal